Khapil is a rural locality (a selo) and the administrative centre of Khapilsky Selsoviet, Tabasaransky District, Republic of Dagestan, Russia. The population was 1,030 as of 2010. Khapil is made up of five streets.

Geography 
Khapil is located 6 km northeast of Khuchni (the district's administrative centre) by road. Tatil is the nearest rural locality.

References 

Rural localities in Tabasaransky District